This is a list of Utah State Aggies football seasons. The Aggies are part of the National Collegiate Athletic Association (NCAA) Division I Football Bowl Subdivision (FBS). Since their inception in 1892, the Aggies have played in over 1,000 games through over a century of play along with 12 bowl games (11 sanctioned by the NCAA), with interruptions occurring from 1893-95, 1897, 1918, and 1943. 

The Aggies have participated in six football conferences in their tenure, with the first being the Rocky Mountain Athletic Conference, which they joined in 1916. They joined the Mountain States Conference (also known as the Skyline Conference) in 1938. They became independent after the 1961 season, continuing that way until 1978, when they joined the Pacific Coast Athletic Association (renamed the Big West Conference in 1988). They left the conference after the 2000 season, lurking as an independent for two seasons until joining the Sun Belt Conference in 2003. After two seasons, they left the conference for the Western Athletic Conference in 2005. They joined the Mountain West Conference in 2013.  Utah State has had 29 head coaches over its tenure, with the first being an unidentified coach who coached them for the inaugural season in 1892 and the most recent being Blake Anderson, who has coached the team since the 2021 season.

Seasons

References

Utah State Aggies

Utah State Aggies football seasons